Lomovoye is a rural locality (a settlement) in Samodedskoye Rural Settlement of Plesetsky District, Arkhangelsk Oblast, Russia. The population was 425 as of 2010. There are 12 streets.

Geography 
Lomovoye is located 186 km north of Plesetsk (the district's administrative centre) by road. Tundra is the nearest rural locality.

References 

Rural localities in Plesetsky District